Michael Anthony Mellows is a former England Amateur International footballer, who later played professionally for Reading and Portsmouth. Born in Woking, Mellows attended Sutton Grammar School for Boys and played firstly for Sutton United before going to train as a teacher at King Alfred College, Winchester. During this time he played in the 1969 FA Amateur Cup Final and made 15 international appearances for the England national amateur football team. While playing for the college he came to the notice of many league scouts and eventually signed for Reading in September 1970, for whom he played 17 games (scoring twice). After his time with the  "Biscuitmen", he had spells with Winchester City and Wycombe Wanderers, before signing for Portsmouth in September 1973 as one of new chairman John Deacon's promised additions to what had been the previous season a very threadbare squad. He came on to make his debut as a substitute in an away victory versus Sheffield Wednesday in October that year and was to remain a regular for the next five years, even winning the clubs coveted "Player of the Year" trophy in 1975. Somewhat a conundrum to the Fratton Faithful his last appearance was at Rotherham on the last day of the 1977/78 season. Mellows then joined Waterlooville and played for them in the Southern League until retiring from football in 1982. A devout Christian, Mellows now runs (with Linvoy Primus) "Faith and Football"- a community initiative which reaches out through sport to the city's youth and disadvantaged.

Notes

1947 births
Sportspeople from Woking
People associated with the University of Winchester
England amateur international footballers
British Christians
Sutton United F.C. players
Reading F.C. players
Portsmouth F.C. players
Winchester City F.C. players
Waterlooville F.C. players
Living people
Association football wingers
English footballers